Moudania Football Club is a Greek football club, based in Nea Moudania, Chalkidiki.

The club was founded in 1928. They played in Football League 2 for the season 2013-14.

References

Association football clubs established in 1928
Football clubs in Central Macedonia
1928 establishments in Greece